Jorge Paulo Lima Alves (born 10 April 1991 in Mindelo), known as Kadú, is a  Cape Verdean footballer.

Honours

with Zawisza Bydgoszcz
 Polish SuperCup Winner (2014)
 Polish Cup Winner (2013/14)

References

External links 

1991 births
Living people
Cape Verdean footballers
People from Mindelo
Association football forwards
Segunda Divisão players
Académica Petróleos do Lobito players
Girabola players
Ekstraklasa players
Miedź Legnica players
Zawisza Bydgoszcz players
Cape Verdean expatriate footballers
Expatriate footballers in Poland
Expatriate footballers in Angola
S.U. Sintrense players